Douglas David Fernandes (born December 13, 1983), known as just Douglas, is a Brazilian football player.

Playing career
Douglas played for J2 League club; Roasso Kumamoto in 2013 season.

Club statistics

References

External links

1983 births
Living people
Brazilian footballers
Brazilian expatriate footballers
Expatriate footballers in Japan
J2 League players
Roasso Kumamoto players
Association football midfielders